AJ Petite-Île is a Réunion football club based in Saint-Joseph.

References

External links
  

Petite-Ile